Nannopetersius lamberti is a species of fish in the African tetra family, found in the African river basins of the Ntem, the Ogowe, the Nyanga and the Kouilou Rivers.

Etymology
The tetra is named in honor of Belgian ichthyologist Jacques G. Lambert (1923-2013), who collected the type specimen.

References

Paugy, D. and S.A. Schaefer, 2007. Alestidae. p. 347-411. In M.L.J. Stiassny, G.G. Teugels and C.D. Hopkins (eds.) Poissons d'eaux douces et saumâtres de basse Guinée, ouest de l'Afrique centrale/The fresh and brackish water fishes of Lower Guinea, west-central Africa. Vol. 1. Coll. Faune et Flore tropicales 42. Istitut de recherche pour le développement, Paris, France, Muséum nationale d'histoire naturelle, Paris, France and Musée royale de l'Afrique centrale, Tervuren, Belgique. 800 p. 

Alestidae
Freshwater fish of Africa
Taxa named by Max Poll
Fish described in 1967